Baad Bhanjyang is a village and former Village Development Committee that is now part of Chandragiri Municipality in Kathmandu District in Province No. 3 of central Nepal. At the time of the 2011 Nepal census it had a population of 3,779 and had 817 houses in it.

References

Populated places in Kathmandu District